The 1993 Intercontinental Cup was an association football match played on 12 December 1993 between Milan, runners-up of the 1992–93 UEFA Champions League, and São Paulo, winners of the 1993 Copa Libertadores. The match was played at the National Stadium in Tokyo.  Milan were making a fifth appearance in the competition, after the victories in 1969, 1989, 1990, and the defeat in 1963. While São Paulo's were looking to defend their title, after victory in the previous edition. Marseille, the winners of 1992–93 UEFA Champions League was not allowed to participate, because of match-fixing scandal involving the club, which saw them stripped from 1992–93 French Division 1 title and banned from international club competitions (1993–94 UEFA Champions League, 1993 European Super Cup and Intercontinental Cup). Because of the scandal, Milan was allowed to play in both the Super Cup and the Intercontinental Cup.

Toninho Cerezo was named man of the match.

Venue

Match details

Man of the Match:
Toninho Cerezo (São Paulo)

See also
1992–93 UEFA Champions League
1993 Copa Libertadores
A.C. Milan in international football competitions

References

Intercontinental Cup
Intercontinental Cup
Intercontinental Cup
Intercontinental Cup (football)
Intercontinental Cup
Intercontinental Cup
Intercontinental Cup (football) matches hosted by Japan
1993 in Brazilian football
1993–94 in Italian football
December 1993 sports events in Asia
Sports competitions in Tokyo
1993 in Tokyo
1993 in association football